The 2010 World Professional Jiu-Jitsu Cup or Abu Dhabi World Professional Jiu-Jitsu Cup was the second edition of the international Brazilian jiu-jitsu tournament organised by the UAE Jiu-Jitsu Federation (UAEJJF) held in Abu Dhabi, United Arab Emirates.

Results 
Purple, Brown and Black Belts

Open Weight Champion received an additional $12,000 bonus.

White and Blue Belts

Female

See also 
IBJJF World Jiu-Jitsu Championship
IBJJF European Jiu-Jitsu Championship
IBJJF Pan Jiu-Jitsu Championship

References 

World Jiu-Jitsu Championship